Languis is the first EP released by Argentine rock band Soda Stereo. It was their sixth record overall and was released in 1989. It featured one new song, "Mundo de Quimeras", recorded in a "Latin rock" style, reminiscent of Carlos Santana (it was the first and last time they tried such an approach to a song.) The album also contained remixes of three songs available on their preceding album.

Track listing

Personnel
Soda Stereo
 Gustavo Cerati – lead vocals / guitar
 Zeta Bosio – bass guitar / backing vocals
 Charly Alberti – drums / percussion

Additional personnel
 Carlos Alomar – producer
 Lenny Pickett – arranger

References 

Soda Stereo EPs
1989 EPs
Sony Music Argentina EPs
Spanish-language EPs